Kim Lewis (born 5 September 1963 in Sydney, New South Wales, Australia) is a television, stage and film actress, best known for her roles in TV series including Julie Scott in The Restless Years and as Jill Taylor / O'Donnell in the television soap opera Sons and Daughters.

Film and TV roles
Her first film role was as Ida Pender in Squizzy Taylor in 1981. Later television appearances include A Country Practice, Home and Away, All Saints and Packed to the Rafters.  
 
She also acted on stage starting from 1986 until 2020, roles include The Heidi Chronicles

Personal life
Lewis has one child with her husband and fellow Australian actor, John Howard.

She also helped produce the film Sweethearts.

Filmography

References

External links

Living people
1963 births
Australian soap opera actresses